OC-1 may refer to:

 OC-1, a class of specifications for SONET optical fiber in telecommunications
 The pseudonym of a US official who shot Guantanamo captive Omar Khadr
 The class of canoe racing: outrigger canoe, one person; see Outrigger canoeing#Racing
 Solo Open Canoe for Whitewater canoeing